The Practical Shooting Federation of Venezuela, Spanish Federacion de Tiro Practico de Venezuela is the Venezuelan association for practical shooting under the International Practical Shooting Confederation.

See also 
 IPSC Venezuelan Handgun Championship

References 

Regions of the International Practical Shooting Confederation
Practical Shooting